Cora Gertrude Burwell (June 25, 1883 – June 20, 1982) was an American astronomical researcher specialized in stellar spectroscopy. She was based at Mount Wilson Observatory from 1907 to 1949.

Early life 
Cora Gertrude Burwell was born in Massachusetts and raised in Stafford Springs, Connecticut. She graduated from Mount Holyoke College in 1906 and was active in Holyoke alumnae activities in the Los Angeles area.

Career 
In July, 1907, Burwell was appointed to a "human computer" position at Mount Wilson Observatory. In 1910, she attended the fourth conference of the International Union for Cooperation in Solar Research, when it was held at Mount Wilson. 

Burwell specialized in stellar spectroscopy. She was solo author on some scientific publications, and co-authored several others (some of which she was lead author), with notable collaborators including Dorrit Hoffleit, Henrietta Swope, Walter S. Adams, and Paul W. Merrill.  With Merrill she compiled several catalogs of Be stars, in 1933, 1943, 1949, and 1950. She also helped to tend the Mount Wilson Observatory Library. She retired from the observatory in 1949, but continued speaking about astronomy to community groups. She also published a book of poetry, Neatly Packed.

Personal life 
Cora Burwell lived in Pasadena, and later in Monrovia with her sister, Priscilla Burwell. She died in 1982, two days before her 99th birthday, in Los Angeles.

References 

1883 births
1982 deaths
20th-century American women scientists
Human computers
Mount Holyoke College alumni
American women astronomers
People from Stafford Springs, Connecticut
Scientists from Massachusetts
Scientists from Connecticut
20th-century American astronomers
Spectroscopists